is a junction passenger railway station located in the city of Inzai, Chiba, Japan, operated jointly by the third-sector railway operator Hokusō Railway and the private railway company Keisei Electric Railway.

Lines
It is also served by the Narita Sky Access connecting downtown Tokyo with Narita Airport, which uses the same tracks as the Hokusō Line.

Station layout
This station consists of one island platform serving two tracks, with an elevated station building located above the tracks and platforms.

Platforms

History
Inba-Nihon-Idai Station was opened on 22 July 2000. On 17 July 2010 a station numbering system was introduced to the Hokusō Line, with the station designated HS14.

Passenger statistics
In fiscal 2018, the station was used by an average of 6,021 passengers daily.

Surrounding area
 Nippon Medical School, Chiba Hokusou Hospital
Juntendo University – Sakura campus

See also
 List of railway stations in Japan

References

External links

 Official station website 

Railway stations in Chiba Prefecture
Railway stations in Japan opened in 2000
Hokusō Line
Stations of Keisei Electric Railway
Railway stations in highway medians
Inzai